Gerald Messlender (1 October 1961 – 20 June 2019) was an Austrian football defender. During his club career, Messlender played for Admira Wacker Wien, Tirol Innsbruck and SC Austria Lustenau. He also featured in the Austria squad for the 1982 FIFA World Cup in Spain.

References

External links

1961 births
2019 deaths
Austrian footballers
Austria international footballers
Association football defenders
1982 FIFA World Cup players
FC Swarovski Tirol players
People from Baden bei Wien
Footballers from Lower Austria
FC Admira Wacker Mödling players
SC Austria Lustenau players
SKN St. Pölten players